The Rhode Island Rams men's basketball team is a college basketball program that competes in NCAA Division I and the Atlantic 10 Conference. The team was recently under the direction of head coach Archie Miller. The Rams play their home games at the Ryan Center (capacity 7,657) which opened in 2002.

The Rams experienced their greatest success by making the Elite Eight in 1998, pulling within 3 points of making their first Final Four in just their 7th appearance before ultimately losing to Stanford.

Current coaching staff

All-Americans
Rhode Island has had three All-Americans in its history.

Postseason

NCAA tournament results

The Rams have appeared in ten NCAA tournaments. They have a combined 8–10 record. Tom Garrick holds the Rhode Island single-tournament game scoring record with 29 points in 1988 during a march to the Sweet Sixteen.
The eighth-seeded 1997–98 Rams, led by senior guards Tyson Wheeler and Cuttino Mobley, had the best tournament run in school history, making it to the Elite Eight.  Six head coaches have led Rhode Island to the NCAA Tournament with four of them registering tourney wins. Success in basketball fell off after the 1998 season, with the Rams making the tournament in 1999 but losing in the First Round. The team has seen a new degree of success recently, qualifying for the NCAA tournament in 2017 and 2018, both times successfully defeating their First Round opponents and advancing to the Second Round.

NIT results
The Rams have appeared in the National Invitation Tournament (NIT) 15 times. Their combined record is 14–16.  The Rams reached the NIT semifinals three times (1945, 1946, and 2010) with their best showing being runner-up in the 1946 final.  Seven head coaches have led Rhode Island to the NIT with four of them recording wins.

CBI results
The Rams have appeared in the College Basketball Invitational (CBI) one time. Their record is 1–1.

NBA players

International players
David Bernsley (born 1969), American-Israeli basketball player
 Xavier Munford (born 1992), basketball player for Hapoel Tel Aviv of the Israeli Basketball Premier League
 Jared Terrell (born 1995), basketball player in the Israeli Basketball Premier League

Participations in FIBA competitions
1978 FIBA Intercontinental Cup: 5th place

References

External links